Randolph Township is located in McLean County, Illinois. As of the 2010 census, its population was 4,375 and it contained 1,636 housing units.

Randolph Township was named for Gardner Randolph, who settled in the area in January 1822, near a thick grove of trees later referred to as Randolph's Grove. The village of Heyworth is part of the township.

Randolph Township was formed in 1858 and sent its first supervisor to Bloomington, the county seat, on May 17, 1858. It is Township 22 North, Range 2 East and part of Township 21 North, Range 2 East of the Third Principal Meridian. It has part of the north tier of sections in Township 2, which were taken by McLean County between 1844 and 1849, instead of giving them back to DeWitt County, when it was formed. It is 6x8 instead of 6x6. It is bounded by Downs Township on the east; Bloomington Township on the north; Funk's Grove Township on the west; and Wapella Township, in DeWitt County, on the south.

In 2008, Randolph Township officials were:
Donald O. Newby, supervisor
Larry W. Mowery, town clerk
Dennis L. Powell, highway commissioner
Glenn H. Milton, assessor
Town Trustees: Del Reinitz, Kevin Rustemeyer, Vernon Terrell, Rodger Zook
Cemetery Trustees: Harold Necessary (president), Kurt Flora (secretary), Dan Billington
Mark J. McGrath, township attorney

Geography

Demographics

References

External links
City-data.com
Illinois State Archives
Center School Collection - McLean County Museum of History archives

Townships in McLean County, Illinois
Townships in Illinois